Jack Walker (2 March 1914 – 29 May 1968) was an English cricketer. He played one first-class match for Kent County Cricket Club in 1949.

Walker was born at Cobham in Kent in 1914. He played as a wicket-keeper at club level for Gravesend Cricket Club and made his only first-class appearance for Kent at The Bat and Ball Ground, playing against Essex in the 1949 County Championship. He scored 19 runs, took two catches and made two stumping in the match which was played on his home club ground. He played twice for the county Second XI in the Minor Counties Championship and was chairman of Cobham Cricket Club for 21 years.

Walker died at Cobham in 1948 after collapsing aged 54. His son, Richard, played regularly for Middlesex and Kent's Second XIs and his grandson, Matt Walker played over 500 matches for Kent and Essex and later coached Kent.

References

1914 births
1968 deaths
English cricketers
Kent cricketers
People from Cobham, Kent